Stephen Walter Rogers (1839–1872) was an African-American preacher, activist, writer, and editorialist. He was historically influential in Louisiana and Alabama; and was one of the people holding civil disobedience against the anti-education laws of the time.

Biography 
Stephen Walter Rogers was enslaved during his early life. Rogers was freed on May 18, 1852. While working as a valet in the area of Mobile, Alabama, Rogers taught fellow slaves to read in a carriage house loft.

He wrote about Abraham Lincoln, and published a book of hymns. He was a pastor at St. Thomas Church in New Orleans. Harper's Magazine described him as one of the most prominent pastors in New Orleans in 1866.

References

African-American Christians
African-American history in New Orleans
1839 births
1872 deaths
African-American activists